Li Jianrui is a Chinese male curler and curling coach.

Record as a coach of national teams

References

External links

Living people
Chinese male curlers
Chinese curling coaches
Year of birth missing (living people)
Place of birth missing (living people)